Kuroshioturris angustata is a species of sea snail, a marine gastropod mollusk in the family Turridae, the turrids.

Description
The length of the shell attains 16.5 mm.

Distribution
This marine species is endemic to New Zealand and occurs at depths between 30 m to 300 m. all around northern and eastern New Zealand. It is also known as a fossil in Mangapanian strata or earliest Nukumaruan strata.

References

 Shuto T. (1961). Conacean gastropods from the Miyazaki Group (Paleontological study of the Miyazaki Group-IX). Memoirs of the Faculty of Science, Kyushu University, series D, Geology. 11(2): 71-150, pls 3-10.
 Higo, S., Callomon, P. & Goto, Y. (1999) Catalogue and Bibliography of the Marine Shell-Bearing Mollusca of Japan. Elle Scientific Publications, Yao, Japan, 749 p

External links
 
 Powell, A.W.B. (1940) The marine Mollusca of the Aupourian Province, New Zealand. Transactions of the Royal Society of New Zealand, 70, 205–248.
  Tucker, J.K. 2004 Catalog of recent and fossil turrids (Mollusca: Gastropoda). Zootaxa 682:1-1295
 Beu, A.G. 2011 Marine Molluscs of oxygen isotope stages of the last 2 million years in New Zealand. Part 4. Gastropoda (Ptenoglossa, Neogastropoda, Heterobranchia). Journal of the Royal Society of New Zealand 41, 1–153
 Gastropods.com: Kuroshioturris angustata

angustata
Gastropods described in 1940
Gastropods of New Zealand